{{DISPLAYTITLE:C15H30O2}}
The molecular formula C15H30O2 (molar mass: 242.40 g/mol, exact mass: 242.2246 u) may refer to:

 13-Methyltetradecanoic acid (13-MTD)
 Pentadecylic acid, or pentadecanoic acid

Molecular formulas